Tuz Buz is the seventh album by Cem Adrian. It was released on November 13, 2017 by UJR Productions.

Track listing
 Kurşun
 Ölüyorum Ellerinde
 Beni Hatırladın mı (feat Birsen Tezer)
 Seni Seviyorum
 Bu Gece Uyut Beni (feat Ceylan Ertem)
 Buruk (feat Halil Sezai)
 Hala Senin Suçun Var
 Yine Özledim
 Zaman
 Gidemem
 Tut Elimi
 Geçecek
 Tuz Buz

References

2017 albums
Cem Adrian albums